Bakhmut (Baxmut) is a rural locality (a selo) and the administrative centre of Bakhmutsky Selsoviet, Kuyurgazinsky District, Bashkortostan, Russia. The population was 618 as of 2010. There are 5 streets.

Geography 
Bakhmut is located 11 km southeast of Yermolayevo (the district's administrative centre) by road. Pokrovka is the nearest rural locality.

References 

Rural localities in Kuyurgazinsky District